Our Lady's Hospital is a health facility located in Manorhamilton, County Leitrim, Ireland. It is managed by Saolta University Health Care Group.

History
The facility, which was commissioned to replace the Surgical Hospital, Manorhamilton, opened in July 1954. It was the largest building constructed in the town since Manorhamilton Castle. After new x-ray equipment was ordered for the hospital, x-ray services, which had been temporarily suspended, were scheduled to resume in October 2019 but staffing shortages led to further delays.

Services
The Regional Rheumatology Centre is based at the hospital.

References

External links
 Official site

1954 establishments in Ireland
Hospitals established in 1954
Hospitals in County Leitrim
Health Service Executive hospitals
Hospital buildings completed in 1954
Manorhamilton